The ARIA Dance Chart is a chart that ranks the best-performing dance singles of Australia. It is published by Australian Recording Industry Association (ARIA), an organisation who collect music data for the weekly ARIA Charts. To be eligible to appear on the chart, the recording must be a single, and be "predominantly of a dance nature, or with a featured track of a dance nature, or included in the ARIA Club Chart or a comparable overseas chart".

In 2014, thirteen singles have topped the chart so far (as of issue date 15 December). "Freaks" by Timmy Trumpet featuring Savage is the longest-running chart-topping dance single of 2014, they were number one for thirteen consecutive weeks.



Chart history

Number-one artists

See also

2014 in music
List of number-one singles of 2014 (Australia)
List of number-one club tracks of 2014 (Australia)

References

Australia Dance
Dance 2014
Number-one dance singles